This article is about the particular significance of the year 1908 to Wales and its people.

Incumbents

Archdruid of the National Eisteddfod of Wales – Dyfed

Lord Lieutenant of Anglesey – Sir Richard Henry Williams-Bulkeley, 12th Baronet  
Lord Lieutenant of Brecknockshire – Joseph Bailey, 2nd Baron Glanusk
Lord Lieutenant of Caernarvonshire – John Ernest Greaves
Lord Lieutenant of Cardiganshire – Herbert Davies-Evans
Lord Lieutenant of Carmarthenshire – Sir James Williams-Drummond, 4th Baronet
Lord Lieutenant of Denbighshire – William Cornwallis-West    
Lord Lieutenant of Flintshire – Hugh Robert Hughes 
Lord Lieutenant of Glamorgan – Robert Windsor-Clive, 1st Earl of Plymouth
Lord Lieutenant of Merionethshire – W. R. M. Wynne 
Lord Lieutenant of Monmouthshire – Godfrey Morgan, 1st Viscount Tredegar
Lord Lieutenant of Montgomeryshire – Sir Herbert Williams-Wynn, 7th Baronet 
Lord Lieutenant of Pembrokeshire – Frederick Campbell, 3rd Earl Cawdor
Lord Lieutenant of Radnorshire – Powlett Milbank

Bishop of Bangor – Watkin Williams 
Bishop of Llandaff – Joshua Pritchard Hughes
Bishop of St Asaph – A. G. Edwards (later Archbishop of Wales) 
Bishop of St Davids – John Owen

Events
22 January – J. Lloyd Williams delivers his paper on Welsh National Melodies and Folk-Songs to the Honourable Society of Cymmrodorion.
28 January – In a colliery explosion at Ammanford, David Rees Griffiths is seriously injured. His brother is one of two men killed.
March – The Local Authorities (Admission of the Press) Act, 1908 is passed as a result of a challenge by Frank Mason, editor of the Tenby Observer, after the local council tried to ban him from their meetings.
26 February – In the West Carmarthenshire by-election, the sitting Liberal MP, John Lloyd Morgan, retains the seat in the absence of any other candidates.
5 March – Edgeworth David leads the party attempting the ascent of Mount Erebus in the Antarctic.
8 April – The Mawddwy Railway is closed to its remaining (freight) traffic.
18 June – A giant turtle weighing half a ton is pulled from the sea at Pwllheli.
16 July – In the Pembrokeshire by-election, brought about by elevation to the peerage of the incumbent Liberal MP, John Wynford Philipps, the seat is retained for the Liberals by Walter Francis Roch.
1 September – The barque Amazon sinks off Margam Sands, with the loss of 18 crew.
14 October – John Ballinger is appointed first librarian of the National Library of Wales.
November – The North and South Wales Bank is absorbed into the London City and Midland Bank, bringing an end to banknote issue in Wales.
21 December – The Coal Mines Regulation Act 1908 ("Eight Hours Act") limits the amount of time spent by coal miners underground.
date unknown
The South Wales Miners' Federation becomes affiliated to the Labour Party.
A factory for making artificial silk is opened at Greenfield, Flintshire by the British Glanzstoff Manufacturing Company.
Construction work begins on the lighthouse at Strumble Head.
Spa pump room built at Caergwrle.

Arts and literature
 Sydney Curnow Vosper completes his iconic watercolour of Welsh piety, Salem.

Awards
National Eisteddfod of Wales - held in Llangollen
Chair - John James Williams, "Ceiriog"
Crown - Hugh Emyr Davies

New books

English language
W. H. Davies - Autobiography of a Super-Tramp
W. Jenkyn Thomas - The Welsh Fairy Book

Welsh language
John Davies Bryan - O'r Aifft
R. Silyn Roberts - Y Blaid Lafur Anibynnol, ei Hanes a'i Hamcan
Gwyneth Vaughan - Plant y Gorthrwm

Music
David Evans becomes professor of the Music department at University of Wales, Cardiff.
Harry Evans - Dafydd ap Gwilym

Sport
Boxing
24 February - Jim Driscoll wins the Commonwealth featherweight title.
Olympics 
October - At the postponed 1908 Summer Olympics, Thomas Scott-Ellis, 8th Baron Howard de Walden, competes unsuccessfully in the motorboat racing.
Rugby league 
1 January - The first-ever international match is held at Aberdare, where Wales defeat New Zealand 9 - 8. The match was won by a last minute try from former Welsh rugby union international Dai Jones.
Aberdare RLFC, Barry RLFC, Mid-Rhondda RLFC and Treherbert RLFC are formed, joining Ebbw Vale and Merthyr Tydfil in competing for the Welsh League, the first Welsh rugby league competition. 
Rugby union
Wales win their first Grand Slam and fifth Triple Crown.
The selection of players for the 1908 British Lions tour to New Zealand and Australia results in a comment by the Welsh Rugby Union that players for future tours should be chosen '...irrespective of the social position of the players.'

Births
29 February – Louie Myfanwy Thomas, novelist as Jane Ann Jones (d. 1968)
22 March – Martin Davies, art historian (d. 1978)
8 May – Bert Day, Wales international rugby union player (d. 1977)
29 May – Diana Morgan, playwright and screenwriter (d. 1996)
5 July – Francis Jones, heraldic expert (d. 1993)
10 July – Donald Peers, singer (d. 1973)
12 July – Bill Roberts, footballer (d. 1976)
15 August – Wynford Vaughan-Thomas, journalist (d. 1987)
14 December – Claude Davey, Wales international rugby union player (d. 2001)

Deaths
6 January – Lewis Pugh Pugh, lawyer and politician, 70
13 January – Caroline Elizabeth Williams, radical and champion of women's rights, 84
26 January – George Thomas Kenyon, politician, 67
1 February – Buckley Roderick, Wales international rugby player, 46
27 February – Norman Biggs, Wales international rugby player, 37
7 March – Richard Edwards, Welsh American educator, 85
21 June – Allen Raine, novelist, 71
24 August – William Bevan, archdeacon of Brecon, 87
4 September – Thomas Judson, Wales international rugby player, (c.) 51
19 October
Catherine Lynch, alcoholic, 28
John Henry Puleston, journalist and politician, 78
9 November – Solomon Andrews, entrepreneur, 73
1 December – Howell Jones, Wales international rugby player, 26
24 December – David John, Mormon leader, 75 (in Utah)

References

 
Wales